Mangifera taipa is a species of plant in the family Anacardiaceae. It is native to the Maluku Islands.

References

taipa
Flora of the Maluku Islands
Data deficient plants
Taxonomy articles created by Polbot